The Servants of India Society was formed in Pune, Maharashtra, on June 12, 1905 by Gopal Krishna Gokhale, who left the Deccan Education Society to form this association. Along with him were a small group of educated Indians, as Natesh Appaji Dravid, Gopal Krishna Deodhar, Surendra Nath Banerjee, and Anant Patwardhan who wanted to promote social and human development and overthrow the British rule in India. The Society organized many campaigns to promote education, sanitation, health care, and fight the social evils of untouchability and discrimination, alcoholism, poverty, oppression of women and for protection of women from domestic abuse. The publication of The Hitavada, the organ of the Society in English from Nagpur commenced in 1911.

Prominent Indians were its members and leaders. It chose to remain away from political activities and organizations like the Indian National Congress.

The base of the Society shrank after Gokhale's death in 1915, and in the 1920s with the rise of Mahatma Gandhi as president of the Congress, who launched social reform campaigns on a mass scale throughout the nation and attracted young Indians to the cause. However, it still continues its activities albeit with a small membership. It has its H.Q. in the city of Pune, Maharashtra. It has its branches in various other states like Uttar Pradesh, Odisha and Uttarakhand. It has its branch office at Allahabad, U.P.

In Odisha, it has its centres at Cuttak, Choudwar and Rayagada. It runs an orphanage in Odisha.

Notes

Indian independence movement